The Austrian Trade Union Federation or Austrian Federation of Trade Unions (de: Österreichischer Gewerkschaftsbund, abbreviated OeGB or ÖGB) is a labour union of employees. It is constituted as an association and is subdivided into seven smaller affiliated trade unions. Each union is traditionally dominated by a certain political faction, with the strongest faction in the ÖGB as a whole traditionally being the social democratic one (Fraktion Sozialdemokratischer GewerkschafterInnen), which is known for its close contacts to Austria's Social Democratic Party (SPÖ); chairmen of the ÖGB have often also been influential SPÖ members.

Affiliated unions
PRO-GE
Union of Construction and Woodworkers (GBH)
Union of Postal and Telecommunications Workers (GPF)
Union of Private Sector Employees, Printing, Journalism, and Paper (GPA-DJP)
Union of Public Services (GÖD)
Vida
Younion

Former affiliates

Presidents
1945: Johann Böhm
1959: Franz Olah
1963: Anton Benya
1987: Fritz Verzetnitsch
2006: Rudolf Hundstorfer (acting)
2008: Erich Foglar
2018: Wolfgang Katzian

References

External links
 OeGB Homepage

Trade unions in Austria
1945 establishments in Austria
National federations of trade unions
Trade unions established in 1945